This article is about the composition of the Regional Council of Lombardy, the legislative assembly of Lombardy, during the VIII Legislature, which is to say the term started in April 2005, following the 2005 regional election, and concluded in April 2010.

Politics of Lombardy